Trumpeting Ecstasy is the third studio album by the American grindcore band Full of Hell. The Kurt Ballou (Converge) produced album was released on May 5, 2017 through Profound Lore Records.

Background
Trumpeting Ecstasy is the band's first "solo" release in four years following back-to-back collaborative studio albums with Merzbow (Full of Hell & Merzbow) and The Body (One Day You Will Ache Like I Ache). Vocalist Dylan Walker says those collaborations had an impact on the creation of Trumpeting Ecstasy, elaborating: "We might not have been willing, or even able, to do some of the things that we were looking to do with the new record. Those guys gave us these nice extra toolsets — like the idea of improvisation or having extra instrumentation outside of the normal rock band style." Though the band hopes the lyrical themes will be interpreted by the listener however they choose, Walker said Trumpeting Ecstasy is about then-current events and also "kind of about man's small goods, like the small good actions being washed away by our species on a larger scale.  If you looked at humanity on a long time line, I kind of feel like humanity got lost at its inception point."

Full of Hell also released the digital-only, four-track EP Trumpeting Ecstasy Remixes in May 2017. The EP notably includes a remix from Ben Chisholm, bassist for the gothic metal band Chelsea Wolfe.

Critical reception
The album was met with generally positive reviews from music critics. Writing for Exclaim!, Denise Falzon gave the album a perfect 10/10, concluding her review by claiming, "Trumpeting Ecstasy is the culmination of Full of Hell really coming into their own, exuding the confidence that comes along with refining their stylistic approach and honing their sound into something that is completely theirs." Zoe Camp of Pitchfork gave the album a 7.7/10.0, stating, "Although Full of Hell spend the majority of Trumpeting Ecstasy examining their usual tricks through an expanded prism, their overall approach remains the same. They take a sweeping panorama of the abyss, compress it down to a single point, and shade it in until it breaks." Both reviewers gave praise for Nicole Dollanganger's pop-influenced guest vocals on the album's title track, "Trumpeting Ecstasy".

Track listing

Personnel 
Full of Hell
 Dylan Walker – vocals, noise
 Spencer Hazard – guitar, noise
 Dave Bland – drums
 Sam DiGristine – bass

Production and artwork
 Kurt Ballou – production
 Brad Boatright – mastering
 Mark McCoy – artwork and design

Guest vocals
 Aaron Turner on "Crawling Back to God" 
 Andrew Nolan on "Ashen Mesh" 
 Nicole Dollanganger on "Trumpeting Ecstasy" 
 Nate Newton on "At The Cauldron's Bottom"

References

External links 
 Trumpeting Ecstasy on Bandcamp
 Trumpeting Ecstasy Remixes on Bandcamp

2017 albums
Full of Hell (band) albums
Profound Lore Records albums
Albums produced by Kurt Ballou